Lankadahanam is a 1971 Indian Malayalam film, directed by J. Sasikumar and produced by K. P. Kottarakkara. The film stars Prem Nazir, Adoor Bhasi, Jose Prakash and Sankaradi in the lead roles. The film had musical score by M. S. Viswanathan.

Cast

Prem Nazir as Appunni Mash
K. P. Ummer as Sekhar, Customs officer
Adoor Bhasi as Mathai/Thirumeni
Jose Prakash as Das
Sankaradi as Adiyodi
Sreelatha Namboothiri
Friend Ramaswamy
Paravoor Bharathan as Inspector
Khadeeja as Rejani's Mother
N. Govindankutty Police superintendent
Ragini as Maheswariamma
Vijayasree as Rejani

Soundtrack
The music was composed by M. S. Viswanathan and the lyrics were written by Sreekumaran Thampi.

References

External links
 

1971 films
1970s Malayalam-language films
Films scored by M. S. Viswanathan
Films directed by J. Sasikumar